Samrat Sarkar is an Indian playback singer, who has sung for jingles, ad films and Bollywood films. he has sung in Marathi, Bhojpuri, Punjabi and Bengali for films. he has performed in nepal, bangladesh, singapore, besides various cities of India.

References 

Samrat Sarkar’s song Ishq Jo Tumse Hua to feature on (EORTV’s) I Love Us 2

External links 
 http://samratonline.com/

1987 births
Living people